Isaías González Cuevas (born 6 July 1940) is a Mexican politician affiliated with the PRI. He currently serves as Senator of the LXII Legislature of the Mexican Congress for Baja California Sur. He also served as member of the Chamber of Deputies during the LVII and LXI legislatures.

References

1940 births
Living people
Politicians from the State of Mexico
Institutional Revolutionary Party politicians
Members of the Chamber of Deputies (Mexico)
Members of the Senate of the Republic (Mexico)
21st-century Mexican politicians
Senators of the LXII and LXIII Legislatures of Mexico